Myŏngch'ŏn County is a kun, or county, in North Hamgyong province, North Korea. The county is home to numerous hot springs.

Administrative divisions
Myŏngch'ŏn County is divided into 1 ŭp (town), 2 rodongjagu (workers' districts) and 13 ri (villages)

Transport
Myŏngch'ŏn is on the Pyongra Line railway.

External links

Counties of North Hamgyong